The Development Bank of Ghana (DBG) is a government-owned development bank in Ghana. Owned by the government of Ghana, the institution has received grants and loans for on-lending to Ghana's commercial banks, from the African Development Bank, the World Bank Group, the European Investment Bank, and the German Development Bank. The DBG focuses on providing indirect loans to small and medium enterprises (SMEs), with less than 100 employees each.

Overview
DBG was stablished in 2021, to provide loans to commercial banks and other financial institutions in Ghana, for on-lending to Ghanaian SMEs. The institution is owned by the Ghanaian government. Funding support has been received from international development institutions as detailed in the previous section. As of June 2022, DBG's total assets were valued at almost US$800 million. At that time, shareholders' equity was US$250 million).

As of June 2022, four commercial banks had signed on to accept funds from DBG, for on-lending to eligible businesses, (a) CalBank (c) Consolidated Bank Ghana (c) Ghana Commercial Bank and (d) Fidelity Bank Ghana.

History
The DBG was established to complement two other government-owned financial houses established before; namely the Agricultural Development Bank of Ghana and the National Investment Bank. However, there lacked long-term lending at reasonable rates to small businesses, "in the agriculture value chain, manufacturing and high-value services".

Future plans
The bank plans to increase its coffers by injecting more capital from the government of Ghana and its development partners. It is the objective of DBG to increase the proportion of banking loans advanced to small businesses from 9 percent in 2022 to 15 percent in 2024.

Board of directors
As of December 2021, DBG's board of directors consisted of: 1. Dr. Yaw Ansu (Chairman) 2. Stephan Leudesdorff 3. Charles Boamah 4. Rosemary Yeboah 5. Mary Boakye 6. Yaw Nsarkoh and 7. Nora Bannerman-Abbott.

Management
As of 31 January 2022, Kwamina Bentsi Enchill Duker is the  chief executive officer of the Development Bank of Ghana. He also serves as a member of the bank's board of directors.

See also

 Economy of Ghana
 List of banks in Ghana
 Agricultural Development Bank of Ghana
 National Investment Bank
 West African Development Bank

References

External links
 Development Bank of Ghana Official Website

Banks of Ghana
Government-owned companies of Ghana
Banks established in 2021
Accra
2021 establishments in Ghana